The European Masters Mountain Running Championships is a biennial one-day international competition in mountain running for masters athletes aged 35 and over, organised by European Masters Athletics. First held in 2006, the competition began to be held in odd-numbered years. It is usually held in the middle of the year. The competition will incorporate trail running for the first time in 2020, as the European Masters Mountain and Trail Running Championships.

Editions

References

Masters athletics (track and field) competitions
Mountain running competitions
Recurring sporting events established in 2006
Continental athletics championships
Biennial athletics competitions
2006 establishments in Europe